The Simili Tour (also known as the Similares Tour and #PausiniStadi) was the eighth concert tour by Italian singer Laura Pausini. Launched in the spring of 2016, the tour promoted her twelfth studio album Simili (2015). Over the course of five months, the tour visited Europe and the Americas.

Background 
In May 2015, Pausini confirmed on her social medias the album release and forthcoming world tour. In November 2015, Pausini announced during an interview that the tour would come to the Americas then back to Europe in October 2016. That same day, she said that the setlists would differ from place to place and that the show structure would be different as well. 6 June 2015 was declared "Simili Day" in three cities: Milan, Rome and Bari.

Opening acts 
Biagio Antonacci 
Giuliano Sangiorgi 
Chiquis Rivera

Setlist 
The following setlist was obtained from the concert held on 4 June 2016, at San Siro in Milan, Italy. It does not present all concerts for the duration of the tour.
"Simili"
"Resta in ascolto"
"Innamorata"
"Non ho mai smesso" / ""Il Nostro Amore Quotidiano" / "Se non te"
"Nella Porta Accanto" / "Bellissimo così" / "Ascolta il tuo cuore"
"Invece no"
"La geografia del mio cammino" / "Chiedilo al Cielo" / "Una storia che vale"
"Sono Solo Nuvole"
"Come se non fosse stato mai amore"
"It's Not Goodbye" / "200 Note"/":it:Seamisai"
"Bom Dia, Tristeza"
"Primavera in anticipo (It Is My Song)"
"Ho Creduto a Me"
"Tra te e il mare"
"Il tuo nome in maiuscolo" / "Nel modo più sincero che c'è" / "Casomai" / "Un fatto ovvio" / "Colpevole" / "La prospettiva di me","Un'emergenza d'amore"
"Celeste" / "È a Lei Che Devo l'Amore"
"Con la musica alla radio" / "Benvenuto" / "Io canto" / "Per la Musica"
"Vivimi"
"E ritorno da te"
"Incancellabile" / "Le cose che vivi" / "Il mondo che vorrei" / "Strani amori" / "La solitudine"
"Limpido" / "Surrender" / "Io C'ero (+ Amore x Favore)" bis
"Lato destro del cuore"

Tour dates 

Cancellations and rescheduled shows

Box office score data

Band 
Electric guitar and musical direction: Paolo Carta
Electric and acoustic guitar: Nicola Oliva
Piano: Fabio Coppini
Keyboards: Andrea Rongioletti
Bass: Roberto Gallinelli
Drums: Carlos Hércules
Percussion: Ernesto López
Strings: Giuseppe Tortora, Adriana Ester Gallo, Mario Gentili, Marcello Iaconetti
Backing vocals: Roberta Granà, Mónica Hill, Gianluigi Fazio, Ariane Diakitè, David Blank, Claudia D'Ulisse
Choreography: Jonathan Redavid
DJ: Joseph Carta

External links

References 

2016 concert tours
Laura Pausini concert tours
Concert tours of Europe